William Paine (June 5, 1750 – April 19, 1833) was a physician and political figure in New Brunswick. He represented Charlotte County in the Legislative Assembly of New Brunswick from 1786 to 1787. Paine was unusual in that he was a United Empire Loyalist who chose to return to the United States.

He was born in Worcester, Massachusetts, the son of Timothy Paine and Sarah Chandler. He was educated at Harvard College, then studied medicine with Doctor Edward Augustus Holyoke and set up practice in Worcester in 1771. In 1773, he married Lois Orne. In 1774, he signed a protest against the activities of the pre-revolutionary committees of correspondence. He was censured for his protest and, later that year, travelled to England to continue his medical studies. Paine received an M.D. from Marischal College in Scotland. He returned to North America and served as apothecary for the British forces. In 1782, he was sent to Halifax, Nova Scotia. Paine was granted land near Passamaquoddy Bay in New Brunswick. He first settled on Letete Island (later Frye's Island) but later moved to Saint John. He served on the city council in 1785 and was elected to the legislative assembly later that year. He returned to Massachusetts to settle his financial affairs there and decided to remain there, despite having been proscribed in the Massachusetts Banishment Act of 1778. He settled first at Salem and then Worcester. He was elected a Fellow of the American Academy of Arts and Sciences in 1791. In 1812, he became an American citizen. Paine became an honorary member of the Massachusetts Medical Society and was a founding member of the American Antiquarian Society. He died at Worcester at the age of 82.

He was a direct maternal ancestor to Alice Roosevelt Longworth.

References

External links
Biography at the Dictionary of Canadian Biography Online

1750 births
1833 deaths
Physicians from Massachusetts
Fellows of the American Academy of Arts and Sciences
Members of the American Antiquarian Society
Members of the Legislative Assembly of New Brunswick
Politicians from Worcester, Massachusetts
Harvard College alumni
Harvard College Loyalists in the American Revolution
Alumni of the University of Aberdeen
American emigrants to pre-Confederation New Brunswick
Colony of New Brunswick people
United Empire Loyalists
British emigrants to the United States